Fritz Island is an island that is located in the Schuylkill River downstream of central Reading, Pennsylvania in the southeast extremity of that city.  Reading's Fritz Island sewer facility is located on the island.

Landforms of Berks County, Pennsylvania
River islands of Pennsylvania
Schuylkill River